Rather Death Than False Of Faith (Metalother Records 1988) is the debut album from UK thrash metal group Hydra Vein.

Overview
Released to positive critical reviews in the metal press, Rather Death Than False Of Faith saw Hydra Vein hailed as the UK's answer to Slayer. The title is a quote from Anne Askew's motto, as it appears in at least one of her portraits.

Track listing
All songs written by Damon Maddison, unless stated
 "Rabid" – 4:28
 "Crucifier" – 4:45
 "The House" – 3:33
 "Right To Die" (Maddison, Danny Ranger) – 7:07
 "Rather Death Than False Of Faith" – 4:39
 "Misanthropic" – 3:12
 "Harlequin" – 7:10
 "Guillotine" – 3:25
 Tracks 2 and 5 also appear on CMFT's UK Thrash Assault compilation (1989)

Credits
 Mike Keen – vocals 
 Danny Ranger – guitars
 Stephen Davis – guitars
 Damon Maddison – bass
 Nathan Maddison – drums
 Recorded and mixed February 27 – March 8, 1988 at Blue Box Studios, Hove, England
 Produced and engineered by Mark Waterman and Charlie McLean

References

External links
Hydra Vein official website

1988 debut albums